Zaza Turmanidze (born 1 April 1965) is a Georgian former wrestler who competed in the 1996 Summer Olympics.

References

1965 births
Living people
Olympic wrestlers of Georgia (country)
Wrestlers at the 1996 Summer Olympics
Male sport wrestlers from Georgia (country)